In taxonomy, Methanomicrobium is a genus of the Methanomicrobiaceae. The cells are shaped like short bars and do not form endospores.  They produce methane via the reduction of carbon dioxide with hydrogen or formate. They cannot metabolize acetate, methylamines, or methanol.

See also
 List of Archaea genera

References

Further reading

Scientific journals

Scientific books

Scientific databases

External links

Archaea genera
Euryarchaeota